Severe Tropical Cyclone Bebe, also known as Hurricane Bebe, was a pre-season storm during October 1972 in the South Pacific Ocean that severely affected Fiji, the Ellice Islands (now Tuvalu), and the Gilbert Islands (now Kiribati).

Meteorological history

The origins of Severe Tropical Cyclone Bebe can be traced to a pair of tropical disturbances, which were first noted on either side of the Equator near the 175th meridian west during October 16. The first system developed in the Northern Hemisphere and eventually developed into Typhoon Olga, before it impacted the Marshall Islands. The second disturbance developed within the South Pacific Ocean and started to move westwards, before it started to show signs of developing into a tropical cyclone during October 19. Over the next couple of days, the system started to move south-westwards and was named Bebe by the New Zealand Meteorological Service, after it had become a category 1 tropical cyclone on the modern-day Australian scale. During October 21, the system passed near or over the Elice Island of Funafuti, where hurricane-force winds were recorded.

The system subsequently passed near to or over Rotuma and peaked with 10-minute sustained winds estimated at 155 km/h (100 mph) and 1-minute sustained wind speeds of 205 km/h (125 mph), which made it equivalent to a category 3 tropical cyclone on both the Australian Scale and Saffir-Simpson hurricane wind scale. After affecting Rotuma with hurricane-force winds during that day, the system moved southwards towards the main islands of Fiji, and appeared on the Cossor Radar screen at the Nadi Meteorological Office during October 23.

The centre of the hurricane moved on to the north coast of Viti Levu. During October 25, Bebe transitioned into an extra-tropical cyclone, before its remnants were last noted on October 28.

Effects 
Bebe adversely affected both Tuvalu and the Fijian islands, where it left 25 people dead (six in Tuvalu and nineteen in Fiji) and thousands homeless. Overall damages were estimated at over $20 million (1972 USD).

Tuvalu

Modern-day Tuvalu (at the time a British colony known as the Ellice Islands) was the first island nation to be affected by Bebe, between October 19 and 22. The system started to affect Tuvalu during October 19, with intermittent heavy rain reported in the island nation, before the weather deteriorated further during the next day, with reported strong winds increasing to gale force, flooding and a rough sea. During October 20, as the seas were rough, the ship Moana Raoi (which had just arrived in Funafuti's lagoon, carrying supplies from Suva, Fiji) was anchored peacefully. After a hurricane warning was received at the New Zealand Meteorological Service weather station, its chief tried to warn as many people as possible, including the Master of the Moana Raoi, the fishery officer of the Van Camp fishing fleet, and the agent of the Gilbert and Ellice Islands development authority.

Little to no significant damage was recorded on the majority of the islands; however, the low-lying island of Funafuti was significantly affected after the system passed over the coral atoll during October 21. Hurricane-force winds were observed on the island for several hours, while a storm surge swept over the island, killing three people, destroying houses, and leaving coral debris.

High seas associated with the system breached a coral wall at the meteorological station, which as a result caused water to sweep through the various buildings and destroy most of the equipment.

Fiji
Bebe affected the whole of the newly independent island nation of Fiji between October 22–25, where it became the worst tropical cyclone since 1952 to affect the islands. Ahead of the system threatening the Fijian Islands, the Nadi weather office issued hurricane warnings for most of the island nation including Rotuma. As a result, hurricane shutters were put up on various buildings, schools were closed, local air service and cruise ships were cancelled while other smaller ships took shelter. The Nadi and Nausori international airports were also closed. On October 22, the Fijian Parliament was adjourned in order to prepare for the hurricane.

During October 23, the system passed over the Fijian Dependency of Rotuma, with hurricane-force wind speeds of around  had been recorded on the island. As a result, widespread damage was reported on the island, with various houses and other buildings either destroyed or extensively damaged. The island also lost the majority of its crops, with coconut palms, copra and citrus trees damaged or destroyed. As a result, it was estimated that between 60%-90% of the population would be dependent on relief supplies for the next three to six months.

See also

Cyclone Tomas
List of off-season South Pacific tropical cyclones
Tuvalu Meteorological Service

References

External links

1972–73 South Pacific cyclone season
Category 3 South Pacific cyclones
Bebe
Tropical cyclones in Fiji
Tropical cyclones in Tuvalu
1972 in Fiji
1972 disasters in Fiji